Minas Tênis Clube (short, just Minas) is a social, recreational and sports club from Belo Horizonte, Brazil. By 2013, it has more than 73,000 members. Its patrimony comprises two urban units, the Minas I and Minas II, and two country units, Minas Country and Minas Tênis Náutico Clube. It also has its own indoor arena, named Juscelino Kubitschek Arena, which is a part of the Minas I complex.

Minas is best known for the professional teams it maintains, in a variety of  olympic sports. It also maintains youth teams, and is recognized to be one of the most important formation centers of new sports talents in Brazil. Currently the club has approximately 1000 competing athletes, being about 900 youth athletes.

History 

The land that would become the first location of Minas Tênis Clube (currently Minas I) was originally assigned to become a zoo at Belo Horizonte's original urban plan, from the 1890s. By the beginning of the 1930s the urban growth surrounded the land with residential areas. In addition, it was very close to the Palácio da Liberdade, by then the official residence of the governor of Minas Gerais state. Thus the plan for a zoo raised environmental and hygiene concerns among the locals and  the top officers of the state administration. Moreover, at the time the city had few entertainment and sports facilities. The then major , aware of this gap, demonstrated the interest to establish a sports center to replace the original project of a zoo.

Concurrently, prominent people from the high society in Belo Horizonte planned to found a big sport club to promote the practice of sports in the city.  Necésio Tavares was the leader of this movement. He had previously created a volleyball team with his own name, and started the movement to get funding and supporting to found a club named Serra. The then 23-year-old named Waldomiro Salles Pereira, whom had the intention to found a club for the practice of tennis, get to know about Necésio's initiative, and approaches him to join forces, and to found a unique new club. Together, they develop the concept of the Serra Tennis Clube.

The group, knowing the intention of the major to promote the sports in the city, asked him to donate the land to the foundation of the new club. The major agrees with the condition that the name should be changed to Minas Tênis Clube, and that the club's first president should be appointed by the then governor of the state, . At the occasion, Necésio Tavares was appointed as the club's first president.

Locations 

The combined area of all locations is  471,000 m² (approximately 108 acres).

Minas I 
The Minas I complex occupies an area larger than 31,000 m² (being 71,000 m² constructed) in the  neighbourhood. The complex is composed by the Juscelino Kubitschek Arena, the Aquatic Park and the Sports square.

Originally, the headquarters was the only one from the club, thus a synonym of the club's name. However, since the opening of Minas II, it was naturally re-branded as Minas I (Minas One) to avoid ambiguity.

Minas II 
It is composed by several sports courts, swimming pools, and the main building, which has administration facilities, and ballroom for events. The name of Minas II ("Minas Two") emerged as a natural  choice since the inception, and remains until today. Moreover, caused the original headquarters to become known as Minas I ("Minas One").

In the early 80's, Minas Tênis Clube  was already established as the most popular and traditional club in Belo Horizonte, and there was a high demand for its expansion. In 1982, it  puts the cornerstone for the second headquarter of the club. The sports facilities were inaugurated in December 1984. In 1985, it was started the constructions of the main building, which was concluded in 1986.

Due to its large size, Minas II has been for long time the chosen venue for large events from the club. This includes the annual June Festival, but also big music concerts and sports tournaments.

Minas Tênis Country Clube 
The Minas Tênis Country Clube is located in Taquaril neighborhood and occupies a total area of 285.750 m², being 148 mil m² of it preserved native vegetation.

The Country Club de Belo Horizonte was a social club founded in 1933, by Alcindo Vieira. Its current main building had its construction started in 1954 and concluded on June 6, 1958. In 2000 it was incorporated by Minas, creating the Minas Tênis Country Clube. The previous members from the Country Club became automatically members from Minas Tênis Clube, thus gaining access to the other facilities.

Minas Tênis Náutico Clube 
The first stage of the construction occupies an area of 29.346 m². It started to be built in 1998, and concluded in March 2000.

Artistic gymnastics 
The club maintains a team of artistic gymnastics since 1977. Currently it competes under the name Sitran/Minas.

Basketball

Futsal 

The professional futsal men's team plays for the Brazilian league.

Honours

International 
 South American Championship - Southern Zone
 Runners-up: 2013

National
 Brazilian Cup:
 Champions: 2002, 2012
 Brazilian league:
 Runners-up: 2002
 Superliga de Futsal:
 Runners-up: 2010
 Southeastern League:
 Champions: 2009, 2010
 Runners-up: 2006, 2011

Regional
 Belo Horizonte Metropolitan Championship:
 Champions: 2001, 2002, 2004, 2005, 2006, 2007, 2008, 2009, 2010, 2011, 2012, 2013
 Minas Gerais State Championship: 
 Champions: 2002, 2004, 2005, 2006, 2007, 2008, 2009, 2010, 2011, 2012

Current squad

Judo 
The club maintain an olympic judo team, which currently disputes under the name Belo Dente/Minas. Among the most successful athletes are Luciano Corrêa, Ketleyn Quadros and Érika Miranda.

Swimming 

The professional swimming team is one of the most successful in Brazil. It is currently runners-up and champion of the two most prestigious national competitions, respectively: the Maria Lenk and José Finkel trophies. Currently the swimming team competes with the name Fiat/Minas, repeating the same name and sponsorship from the men's volleyball team in the late 80's.

Among the most famous swimmers that have competed for the team, there are Kaio Márcio de Almeida, Joanna Maranhão, Thiago Pereira, Marcus Mattioli, Rogério Romero and the Olympic champion César Cielo.

History 
Swimming is practiced in Minas since its inception. At the Maria Lenk Trophy, the club finished in second place, with 1990.5 points.

The team highlights were the victory of César Cielo in the 100-metre freestyle, with 48.13. Nicolas Oliveira was 4th (49.12) and Marco Antonio Macedo was the eighth (50:25).

At the José Finkel Trophy, the team finished 1st, with 2945 points and 19 golds, 13 silver and 11 bronzes (total: 44).

It was the fourth victory of Minas in a row.
The highlight was the victory of Miguel Valente in 800-metre freestyle, with 7'44.84, being the best time of the world in 2014 until then.

Minas started the Maria Lenk trophy as the team to be beaten, given its renowned swimmers. The club lead the competition until the last day, when it was surpassed by Pinheiros with the tight different of 5 points.

Minas finished the competition in second place, with 2,133.
One of the highlights was the gold of Thiago Pereira at the 400-metre medley, with 4'13.94.

The result qualified him for the FINA World Championship, in Kazan.

In August Minas won the José Finkel Trophy, in a close dispute with the host team Pinheiros.
It was the club's fifth victory in a row, in a total of 11 championships.

Honors 
 Maria Lenk Trophy / Brazilian Summer Trophy (long course):
 Champions: 1988, 1990, 1992, 1994, 1994, 1996, 1997, 2011, 2013 (9)
 José Finkel Trophy / Brazilian Winter Trophy (short course):
 Champions: 1988, 1991, 1993, 1994, 1996, 1998, 2011, 2012, 2013, 2014, 2015, 2019 (12)

Tennis 
The club maintains a tennis team, which competes under the name Cultura Inglesa/Minas.

Trampolining 
The club maintains a trampolining team since 1999. Currently it competes under the name BH Shopping/Minas.

Volleyball - Men 

The men's professional volleyball team plays at the Superliga Brasileira de Voleibol. It is the most successful professional Brazilian team, with a record of nine national titles.

History 
The first volleyball teams from Minas Tênis Club were formed in 1937.

In the decade of 1980 the volleyball gained major attendance in Brazil. The first national professional championship was organized in 1981. Also, the decade was the era of so-called "silver generation", in a reference to the team that won the silver medal in men's volleyball in the Olympic games of Los Angeles. The team, at time sponsored by the Italian car manufactured Fiat, was the major power of the Brazilian volleyball. The team led by the Korean coach Young Wan Sohn won three titles in a row. At that time it created a major rivalry with two other teams from São Paulo state: Banespa and Pirelli.

During the 1990s the team had major success, winning three titles in a row. The team was named after Telemig Celular, a former mobile carrier. It was acquired by Vivo, which continued the sponsorship until today.

Honors 
Minas Tenis Clube is the most successful team in the history of Brazilian Men's volleyball. They have a record of nine national titles.
 South-American Championship:
 Champions: 1984, 1985, 1999
 Runners-up: 2013, 2022
 Guarani Trophy of Champion Clubs
 Champions: 1963
 Brazilian Championship of Champion Clubs
 Champions: 1964
 Brazilian Championship:
 Champions: 1984, 1985, 1986
 Brazilian League:
 Runners-up: 1988–89
 Brazilian Superleague
 Champions: 1999–00, 2000–01, 2001–02, 2006–07
 Runners-up: 2004–05, 2005–06, 2008–09
 Minas Gerais state championship:
 Champions: 1970, 1971, 1972, 1973, 1976, 1977, 1978, 1979, 1984, 1985, 1998, 1999, 2000, 2001, 2002, 2003, 2004, 2005, 2006, 2007, 2019
 Runners-up: 2008, 2009, 2010, 2011, 2012, 2013, 2015
 São Paulo state championship  (representing Esporte Clube Pinheiros):
 Champions: 2005, 2006
 Runners-up: 2007, 2008

Current squad 
Squad as of October 2019

Volleyball - Women 

The women's volleyball team plays at the Brazilian Superleague and the Minas Gerais state league. By 2020 it disputed under the name Itambé/Minas.

History 
Volleyball has been practiced in Minas since its opening, in 1937. During the early 1990s, Minas was one of the most successful teams in Brazil. The team was second place in the 1991–92, and won the 1992–93 Brazilian League. The main players were Hilma, Ana Paula, Leila and Ana Flávia, whom also played for the Brazil women's national volleyball team.

From late 1990s until the season 2010/2011 the team played with the name MRV/Minas. During this period the team had noticeable performance, winning its second Brazilian Superleague championship, and also being runner-up twice.

During the seasons 2011/2012 and 2012/2013 the team played under the name Usiminas/Minas. The team achieved fourth and seventh positions, respectively, in the Brazilian Superliga.

In April 2013 Usiminas announced that it would not renew the partnership. The team did not signed with any other sponsor and  will play the season 2013/2014 without sponsorship, using the club's original name. In the beginning of 2014 the team signed the contract, and changed its commercial name to Decisão Engenharia/Minas. For the season 2014/2015 the team started playing under the name Camponesa/Minas. After a poor start to the season, losing the first six matches, the team signed olympic champion wing-spiker Jaqueline Carvalho, who was a free agent after missing the entire previous season due to her pregnancy, led by her, the team quickly turned its fortunes around, finishing 5th in the regular season and making to the semifinals, where they lost to Rexona-Ades. In 2015-16, despite Jaqueline's departure to SESI-SP,  the team had its best season since the MRV years, finishing 3rd in the regular season, once again losing in the semifinals, this time to intrastate rival Dentil/Praia Clube.

For the 2016-17 season, the team signed american opposite Destinee Hooker on a prove-it deal. Without her to start the season, however, the team was very inconsistent, sitting at a 3-4 record after the first 7 games. During that span, the team signed Jaqueline once again in the free agency, after she found herself without a team for months following the end of the 2015-16 season. Hooker finally debuted in a 3-2 win over Fluminense in the following game, Jaqueline debuted later during midseason. Anchored by Hooker, aided by Jaqueline and also counting on a breakout years from young players like wing-spiker Rosamaria and middle-blocker Mara, the team proceeded to win 12 of the 15 final games (including a 9-game win streak), finishing 4th in the final regular season standings. Once again, Minas found themselves defeated in the semifinals, in a thrilling 5-game series against Rexona-Sesc. Despite missing the first 7 games, Hooker finished as the 2nd highest scorer in the tournament with 404 points, beating teammate Rosamaria (who scored 403 herself) and only behind Vôlei Nestlé's Tandara Caixeta. Hooker also finished the tournament as the most efficient spiker, making the Superliga team of the year. Mara also made it, as she finished 3rd in blocks but was also the most efficient blocker of the tournament on a per play basis.

In the 2018-19 season, Italian head coach Stefano Lavarini lead the team to another Superliga title. In 2021, coach Negro, another Italian, accomplished the same. Just like Lavarini, coach Negro beat Praia Clube in the final series 2-1. Under coach Negro, Minas won the South American Championship in 2020, in October of the same year the Mineiro Championship (of the state of Minas Gerais), then in 2021 the Brazilian Cup. Minas closed the season with 34 wins out of 37 games.

Honors

International  
World Championship:
 Runners-up:  1992, 2018
 South American Championship:
 Champions: 1999, 2000, 2018,  2019, 2020
 Salonpas Cup:
 Runners-up:  2002
 Third place: 2004, 2007

National 
 Brazilian Championship of Champion Clubs / Guarani Trophy:
 Champions: 1963, 1964
 Runners-up: 1962
 Brazilian Trophy:
 Champions: 1974
 Brazilian Championship:
 Runners-up: 1978, 1981
 Brazilian League:
 Champions: 1992/93
 Runners-up: 1991/92
 Brazilian Superleague:
 Champions: 2001/02, 2018/19, 2020/21
 Runners-up: 1999/00, 2002/03, 2003/04
 Third place: 2006/07
 Brazilian Cup:
 Champions: 2019, 2021
 Runners-up: 2017

Regional 

 Minas Gerais state championship:
 Champions: 1940, 1946, 1949, 2003, 2019, 2020
 Runners-up: 2010, 2013
 São Paulo state championship:
 Third place: 2002, 2003, 2004, 2006

Squad
2021-2022 squad - As of November 2021

Head coach:  Nicola Negro

References

External links 
 

Basketball teams in Brazil
Sports teams in Belo Horizonte
Novo Basquete Brasil
Futsal clubs in Brazil
1935 establishments in Brazil
Brazilian volleyball clubs
Multi-sport clubs in Brazil
Sport in Belo Horizonte
Volleyball clubs established in 1937
Swim teams in Brazil
Volleyball clubs in Minas Gerais (state)